Epworth is an unincorporated community and census-designated place (CDP) in Fannin County, Georgia, United States. As of the 2010 census it had a population of 480. A former name was Atalla. The ZIP code is 30541.

Epworth is located on Georgia State Route 5 between Blue Ridge (the county seat to the south) and McCaysville (on the Tennessee state line to the north).

History
Prior to European colonization, the area that is now Epworth was inhabited by the Cherokee people and other Indigenous peoples for thousands of years.

A post office called Epworth has been in operation since 1901. The Georgia General Assembly incorporated the place in 1906 as the "Town of Epworth". The community was named after Epworth, in England.

Education
Epworth is also the location of an Appalachian Technical College campus which closed, and was later slated to reopen as a campus of North Georgia Technical College.

References

Census-designated places in Fannin County, Georgia
Unincorporated communities in Georgia (U.S. state)
Census-designated places in Georgia (U.S. state)